Greatest Hits is a compilation album released by rap group, Luniz. It was released on May 10, 2005 for C-Note Records.

Track listing
"Intro" - 0:51
"So Much Drama" (featuring Nick Nack) - 5:14
"Just Me and You" (featuring Raphael Saadiq) - 4:54
"Oakland Raiders" - 4:48
"Playa Hata" (featuring Teddy) - 4:32
"In My Nature" featuring (Eightball & MJG) - 5:25
"Fuck You" featuring (C-Bo) - 4:11
"I Got 5 on It" (featuring Michael Marshall) - 4:13
"Killers on the Payroll" (featuring Phats Bossalini, Madd Maxx and Poppa LQ) - 6:03
"Big Face Escalade" (featuring Nick Nack) - 3:37
"Pimps, Payers Hustlers" (featuring Richie Rich and Dru Down) - 5:02
"Baby Momma" - 4:13
"Closer Than Close" (featuring Dru Down) - 4:50
"Broke Hoes Is a No No" - 4:12
"Mob" - 5:13
"Break Me Off" (featuring Treach and IMx) - 4:11

References 

Luniz albums
2005 greatest hits albums